Vikram Chopra (also known as Vicky Chopra) born on 9 June is an Indian film director, screen writer and actor.  He is the nephew of Indian filmmaker Vidhu Vinod Chopra.

Career
He has acted in the Bollywood films Bada Din, Kareeb, Sangharsh, Mission Kashmir and Kasoor and in television serials A Mouthful of Sky, Bheja Fry, X Zone, Samandar, Khushi,  and Ajeeb Dastan.

He directorial debut was with the film Fight Club: Members Only.  He is currently working on another motion picture titled Season's Greetings.   He is the head of Vikram Chopra Productions.

Filmography
 Films

Television

References

External links

Vicky Chopra's official Facebook
The Hindu: interview with Vikram Chopra about Fight Club

Living people
Year of birth missing (living people)
Male actors in Hindi cinema